The list of Argentine footballers in Serie B records the association football players from Argentina who have appeared at least once for a team in the Italian Serie B. Entries in bold denote players still active in actual season.

A
Luciano Abecasis – Pescara – 2014–15
Joel Acosta – Pescara – 2015–16
Pepito Agosto – Livorno – 1935–36
Luis Alfageme – Brescia, Grosseto, Ternana – 2006–07, 2009–14
Bruno Amione – Reggina – 2021–22
Federico Andrada – Bari – 2017–18
Cristian Ansaldi – Parma – 2022–
Juan Antonio – Ascoli, Brescia, Sampdoria, Varese – 2010–14
Sergio Bernardo Almirón – Verona, Empoli, Catania – 2003–05, 2014–15
Carlos Dario Aurellio – Brescia, Cosenza – 1999–2001

B

Abel Balbo – Udinese – 1990–92
Juan Barbas – Lecce – 1986–88
Evaristo Barrera – Cremonese – 1945–46
Carlos Barrionuevo – Salernitana – 2008–09
Gabriel Batistuta – Fiorentina – 1993–94
Carlos Bello – Taranto – 1993–94
Nicolas Belloni – Pescara – 2020–21
César Bertolo – Cremonese, Sanremese – 1936–37, 1938–40
Domingo Bertolo – Sanremese – 1938–40
Albano Bizzarri – Foggia, Perugia – 2018–19
Silvio Bonino – Palermo – 1942–43
Gabriel Miguel Bordi – Napoli – 1999–2000
Rubén Botta – Bari – 2022–
Juan Brunetta – Parma – 2021–22

C

Fernando Cafasso – Treviso – 2008–09
Adrián Calello – Catania – 2014–15
Juán Calichio – Empoli – 1947–48
Salvador Calvanese – Catania – 1966–67
Hugo Campagnaro – Piacenza, Pescara – 2003–07, 2015–16, 2017–20
Claudio Caniggia – Atalanta – 1999–2000
Franco Carboni – Cagliari – 2022–23
Luis Carniglia – Monza, Cesena – 1963–64, 1968–70
Tiago Casasola – Como, Trapani, Salernitana, Cosenza, Frosinone, Cremonese, Perugia – 2015–
José Ignacio Castillo – Frosinone, Pisa – 2006–08
Lucas Castro – Catania, SPAL – 2014–15, 2020–21
Maximiliano Cejas – Latina – 2013–14
Sebastian Cejas – Siena, Ascoli, Fiorentina, Pisa – 2001–04, 2008–09
Gastón Cellerino – Livorno – 2008–09, 2010–11
Jose Chamot – Pisa – 1991–93
Leandro Chichizola – Spezia, Perugia, Parma – 2014–17, 2021–
José Compagnucci – Anconitana – 1946–48
Santiago Colombatto – Cagliari, Trapani, Perugia, Verona – 2015–19
Raúl Conti – Bari – 1961–62
Lucas Correa – Varese 2010–11
Claudio Cuffa – Padova – 2009–14
Marcos Curado – Crotone, Frosinone, Perugia – 2018–

D
Franco Da Dalt – Triestina – 2005–06, 2007–08
Isaías Delpupo – Cagliari – 2022–
Germán Denis – Reggina – 2020–22
Leandro Depetris – Brescia, Gallipoli – 2005–07, 2009–10
Gustavo Dezotti – Cremonese – 1990–91, 1992–93
Vicente Di Paola – Pisa – 1949–50
Juan Docabo – Perugia – 1997–98
Mariano Donda – Bari – 2007–09
Paulo Dybala – Palermo – 2013–14

E
Horacio Erpen – Venezia, Triestina, Sassuolo, Juve Stabia – 2004–06, 2008–09, 2011–13
Gonzalo Escalante – Catania – 2014–15
Marcos Espeche – Reggiana – 2020–21
Juán Esposto – Palermo – 1930–31
Nahuel Estévez – Crotone, Parma – 2021–

F
Emir Faccioli – Frosinone – 2010–11
Cristian Fernández Parentini – Venezia, Spezia – 2003–04, 2007–08
Mariano Fernández – Torino – 2003–04
Franco Ferrari – Brescia, Livorno – 2018–20
Domingo Ferraris – Torino – 1929–30
Luciano Figueroa – Genoa – 2006–07
Fabricio Fontanini – Vicenza – 2016–17
Alejandro Frezzotti – Treviso – 2008–09

G
Luciano Galletti – Napoli – 1999–2000
Francisco Garraffa – Livorno – 1935–37
Matias Garavano – Gallipoli – 2009–10
Carlos Garavelli – Casale – 1938–39
Emanuel Gigliotti – Novara – 2010–11
Damián Giménez – Pescara – 2005–07
Juanito Gómez Taleb – Triestina, Verona, Cremonese – 2005–06, 2011–13, 2016–18
Pablo Andrés González – Novara – 2010–11, 2012–14, 2015–16
Raúl Alberto González – Crotone, Salernitana, Cosenza – 2001–03
Nicolas Gorobsov – Vicenza, Torino – 2007–11
Ariel Damian Grana – Venezia – 2004–05
Ariel Leo Griffo – Como – 2003–04
Ruben Gerardo Grighini – Venezia, Vicenza – 2004–06
Fausto Grillo – Trapani – 2019–20
Salvador Gualtieri – Vicenza, Anconitana – 1949–51

H
Esteban José Herrera – Messina – 2003–04
Claudio Husaín – Napoli – 2001–03

I
Mauro Icardi – Sampdoria – 2011–12
Gaspar Iñíguez – Ascoli – 2018–19
Emmanuel Interlandi – Messina – 1935–38
Pablo Eduardo Islas – Venezia – 2003–04
Mariano Julio Izco – Cosenza, Juve Stabia – 2018–20

J
Cristian Jeandet – Fidelis Andria – 1997–98

L
Christian La Grotteria – Palermo – 2001–03
Santiago Ladino – Bari – 2007–08
Juan Manuel Landaida – Venezia, Triestina – 2004–06
Juán Landolfi – Padova, Viareggio – 1942–43, 1947–48
Joaquín Larrivey – Cosenza, Südtirol – 2021–
Federico Raúl Laurito – Livorno, Empoli – 2008–09, 2010–11
Leandro Lázzaro – Salernitana – 2001–02
Emmanuel Ledesma – Salernitana, Crotone – 2008–09, 2010–11
Sebastián Leto – Catania – 2014–15
Gaston Liendo – Venezia – 2003–04
Marcos Locatelli – Genoa – 1965–68
Nicolás Lombardo – Pisa – 1934–36
Miguel Longo – Cagliari, Atalanta – 1962–64, 1969–70
Lucas Longoni – Triestina – 2010–11
Ariel López – Genoa – 1997–98
Juán Carlos Lopez – Juve Stabia – 1951–52
Maxi López – Crotone – 2019–20

M
Julián Magallanes – Vicenza, Cittadella – 2008–12
Carlos Marinelli – Torino – 2004–05
Diego Fernando Markic – Bari – 2001–04
Enrique Martegani – Palermo – 1954–55
Oscar Massei – SPAL – 1964–65
Carlos Matheu – Siena – 2013–14
Américo Menutti – Bari, Lecce – 1941–42
Rubens Merighi – Modena – 1964–67, 1968–72
Mariano Messera – Catania – 2004–05
Raúl Mezzadra – Bari, Cesena – 1940–41, 1942–43
Diego Milito – Genoa – 2004–05
Matias Miramontes – Venezia, Ancona, Triestina – 2003–05, 2008–11
Lucas Rodrigo Montero – Ternana – 2004–06
Luciano Fabián Monzón – Catania – 2014–15
Santiago Morero – Cesena, Siena, Avellino – 2012–14, 2017–18
Juan Carlos Morrone – Lazio, Foggia, Avellino – 1961–63, 1967–69, 1973–74
Ezequiel Muñoz – Palermo – 2013–14

N
Roberto Nanni – Crotone – 2006–07
Federico Nieto – Verona – 2006–07
Fabio Nigro – Lazio – 1987–88

O
Rodolfo Orlandini – Genoa – 1934–35
Aldo Osorio – Crotone, Lecce – 2001–03

P
Rodrigo Palacio – Brescia – 2021–22
Fernando Pandolfi – Perugia – 1997–98
Pedro Pasculli – Lecce – 1986–88, 1991–92
Nehuén Paz – Crotone – 2021–22
Diego Peralta – Pisa, Ternana – 2016–17, 2021–
Sixto Peralta – Torino – 2000–01
Gino Peruzzi – Catania – 2014–15
Gonzalo Piermarteri – Catania – 2014–15
Mauricio Pineda – Cagliari – 2002–03
Pedro Pompei – Cremonese, Cosenza – 1941–48
Franco Ponzinibio – Pisa – 1937–40
Victor José Pozzo – Padova, Parma – 1942–43, 1946–48
Juán Pratto – Genoa – 1934–35

Q
Diego Quintero – Salernitana – 2000–01
Jorge Quinteros – Padova – 1997–98

R

Diego Raimondi – Pisa – 2007–09
Gustavo Reggi – Crotone, Reggina – 2000–02
Tobías Reinhart – Spezia – 2019–20
Pablo Ricchetti – Ternana – 2005–06
Adrian Ricchiuti – Genoa, Pistoiese, Rimini – 1996–2001, 2005–09
Lucas Roberto Rimoldi – Genoa, Frosinone – 2004–05, 2006–07
Lautaro Rinaldi – Brescia – 2017–18
Fabián Rinaudo – Catania – 2014–15
Emanuel Benito Rivas – Bari, Varese, Verona, Spezia, Livorno – 2008–09, 2011–15
Juan Salvador Rizzo – Pisa – 1936–37
Braian Robert – Catanzaro – 2004–05
José Rodríguez – Salernitana – 1948–49
Leo Rodríguez – Atalanta – 1994–95
Sergio Romero – Sampdoria – 2011–12
Federico Rosso – Brescia – 2012–13
Húgo Daniel Rubini – Ravenna – 1996–98
Silvio Rudman – Padova – 1996–97

S
Mario Santana – Palermo, Frosinone – 2002–03, 2014–15
Gastón Sauro – Catania – 2014–15
Nicolás Schiavi – Novara – 2015–16, 2017–18
Federico Scoppa – Vicenza – 2020–21
Roberto Nestor Sensini – Udinese – 1990–92
Adalberto Sifredi – Salernitana, Livorno – 1948–50
Matías Silvestre – Livorno – 2019–20
Diego Simeone – Pisa – 1991–92
Lucas Simon – Piacenza – 2006–10
Roberto Sosa – Ascoli, Messina, Napoli – 2003–04, 2006–07
Víctor Sotomayor – Verona – 1990–91
Claudio Spinelli – Crotone – 2018–19
José Spirolazzi – Fanfulla Lodi – 1939–43
Nicolás Spolli – Catania, Crotone – 2014–15, 2018–20
José Surano – Cremonese – 1947–48

T
Juan Tacchi – Napoli – 1961–62, 1963–65
Leonardo Talamonti – Atalanta – 2010–11
Pedro Troglio – Ascoli – 1992–94
Federico Turienzo – Salernitana – 2008–09

V

Lautaro Valenti – Parma – 2021–
Nahuel Valentini – Spezia, Ascoli, Vicenza – 2014–17, 2018–21
Franco Vázquez – Palermo, Parma – 2013–14, 2021–
Santiago Vernazza – Palermo – 1957–59
Ricardo Matias Veron – Reggina, Crotone, Salernitana – 2001–02, 2003–04, 2006–07
Jonathan Vidallé – Cremonese – 1998–99
Leonardo Raul Villa – Venezia, Triestina – 2004–06
Ricardo Villar – Cesena – 2006–08
Santiago Visentin – Crotone, Cittadella – 2021–
Carlos Volante – Livorno – 1932–33
Agustín Vuletich – Salernitana – 2018–19

Y
Carlos Alberto Yaqué – Reggina – 1997–99
Andrés Yllana – Brescia, Verona – 1999–2000, 2002–03

Z
Facundo Zabala – Venezia – 2022–23
Mauro Zanotti – Ternana – 2003–05
Mauro Zárate – Cosenza – 2022–
Luciano Zavagno – Catania, Pisa, Ancona, Torino – 2005–06, 2007–12
Bruno Zuculini – Verona – 2016–17
Franco Zuculini – Bologna, Verona, Venezia, SPAL – 2014–15, 2016–17, 2019–20, 2021–

See also
List of foreign Serie B players
List of Argentine footballers in Serie A

Notes

References

Argentina
Serie B footballers
Argentine expatriate footballers
Association football player non-biographical articles